Diselenide may refer to:

Diselane, H-Se-Se-H
Carbon diselenide, CSe2, a yellow-orange oily liquid with pungent odor
 Any organic chemical compound with a selenium-selenium bond, R-Se-Se-R
Diphenyl diselenide, (C6H5)–Se–Se–(C6H5)
selenocystine
Metal dichalcogenides
Manganese diselenide (MnSe2)
Molybdenum diselenide (MoSe2)
Tungsten diselenide (WSe2)
Titanium diselenide (TiSe2)